Transformers is a series of science fiction action films based on the Transformers franchise of the 1980s. Michael Bay directed the first five films: Transformers (2007), Revenge of the Fallen (2009), Dark of the Moon (2011), Age of Extinction (2014), and The Last Knight (2017), and has served as a producer for subsequent films.  A sixth film Bumblebee, directed by Travis Knight and produced by Bay, was released on December 21, 2018. A seventh film, Rise of the Beasts, directed by Steven Caple Jr. and produced by Bay, is to be released on June 9, 2023.

The series has been distributed by Paramount Pictures, and DreamWorks Pictures worked on the first two films. The original Transformers series has received negative to mixed reception, except for Bumblebee, which received positive reviews. It is the 14th-highest-grossing film series, with a total of $4.8 billion; the series' films have generally been successful at the box office, with Dark of the Moon and Age of Extinction grossing over $1 billion each.

Films

Development

Transformers (2007) 

For the film, producer Don Murphy was planning a G.I. Joe film adaptation, but when the U.S. launched the invasion of Iraq in March 2003, Hasbro suggested adapting the Transformers franchise instead. Tom DeSanto joined Murphy because he was a fan of the series. They met with comic book writer Simon Furman, and cited the Generation 1 cartoon and comics as their main influence. They made the Creation Matrix their plot device, though Murphy had it renamed because of the film series The Matrix. DeSanto chose to write the treatment from a human point of view to engage the audience, while Murphy wanted it to have a realistic tone, reminiscent of a disaster film. The treatment featured the Autobots Optimus Prime, Ironhide, Jazz, Prowl, Arcee, Ratchet, Wheeljack, and Bumblebee, and the Decepticons Megatron, Starscream, Soundwave, Ravage, Laserbeak, Rumble, Skywarp and Shockwave.

Steven Spielberg, a fan of the comics and toys, signed on as executive producer in 2004. John Rogers wrote the first draft, which pitted four Autobots against four Decepticons, and featured the Ark spaceship. Roberto Orci and Alex Kurtzman, fans of the cartoon, were hired to rewrite the script in February 2005. Spielberg suggested that "a boy and his car" should be the focus. This appealed to Orci and Kurtzman because it conveyed themes of adulthood and responsibility, "the things that a car represents in the United States". The characters of Sam and Mikaela were the sole point of view given in Orci and Kurtzman's first draft. The Transformers had no dialogue, as the producers feared talking robots would look ridiculous. The writers felt that even if it would look silly, not having the robots speak would betray the fanbase. The first draft also had a battle scene in the Grand Canyon. Spielberg read each of Orci and Kurtzman's drafts and gave notes for improvement. The writers remained involved throughout production, adding additional dialogue for the robots during the sound mixing (although none of this was kept in the final film, which ran fifteen minutes shorter than the initial edit). Furman's The Ultimate Guide, published by Dorling Kindersley, remained as a resource to the writers throughout production. Prime Directive was used as a fake working title. This was also the name of Dreamwave Productions' first Transformers comic book.

Michael Bay was asked to direct by Spielberg on July 30, 2005, but he dismissed the film as a "stupid toy movie". Nonetheless, he wanted to work with Spielberg, and gained a new respect for the mythology upon visiting Hasbro. Bay considered the first draft "too kiddie", so he increased the military's role in the story. The writers sought inspiration from G.I. Joe for the soldier characters, being careful not to mix the brands. Because Orci and Kurtzman were concerned the film could feel like a military recruitment commercial, they chose to make the military believe nations like Iran were behind the Decepticon attack as well as making the Decepticons primarily military vehicles. Bay based Lennox's struggle to get to the Pentagon phone line while struggling with an unhelpful operator from a real account he was given by a soldier when working on another film.

Orci and Kurtzman experimented with numerous robots from the franchise, ultimately selecting the characters most popular among the filmmakers to form the final cast. Bay acknowledged that most of the Decepticons were selected before their names or roles were developed, as Hasbro had to start designing the toys. Some of their names were changed because Bay was upset that they had been leaked. Optimus, Megatron, Bumblebee and Starscream were the only characters present in each version of the script. Arcee was a female Transformer introduced by Orci and Kurtzman, but she was cut because they found it difficult to explain robotic gender; Bay also disliked her motorcycle form, which he found too small. An early idea to have the Decepticons simultaneously strike multiple places around the world was also dropped, being used later in the film's sequels.

Transformers: Revenge of the Fallen (2009) 

In September 2007, Paramount announced a late June 2009 release date for the sequel to Transformers. A major hurdle that was overcome during the film's production was the 2007–2008 Writers Guild of America strike, as well as possible strikes by the Directors Guild of America and the Screen Actors Guild. Bay began creating animatics of action sequences featuring characters rejected for the 2007 film; this would allow animators to complete sequences if the Directors Guild of America went on strike in July 2008, which ultimately did not happen. The director considered making a small project in between Transformers and its sequel, but knew "you have your baby and you don't want someone else to take it". The film was given a $200 million budget, which was $50 million more than the 2007 film, and some of the action scenes rejected for the original were written into the sequel, such as the way Optimus is reintroduced in this film. Lorenzo di Bonaventura said the studio proposed filming two sequels simultaneously, but he and Bay concurred that was not the right direction for the series.

Writers Roberto Orci and Alex Kurtzman originally passed on the sequel because of a busy schedule. The studio began courting other writers in May 2007, but as they were unimpressed with their pitches, they convinced Orci and Kurtzman to return. The studio also signed on Ehren Kruger, as he impressed Bay and Hasbro president Brian Goldner with his knowledge of the Transformers mythology, and because he was friends with Orci and Kurtzman. The writing trio were paid $8 million. Screenwriting was interrupted by the 2007–2008 Writers Guild of America strike, but to avoid production delays the writers spent two weeks writing a treatment, which they handed in the night before the strike began, and Bay expanded the outline into a sixty-page scriptment, fleshing out the action, adding more jokes, as well as selecting the majority of new characters. The three writers spent four months finishing the screenplay while "locked" in two hotel rooms by Bay: Kruger wrote in his own room and the trio would check on each other's work twice a day.

Orci described the film's theme as "being away from home", with the Autobots contemplating living on Earth as they cannot restore Cybertron, while Sam goes to college. He wanted the focus between the robots and humans "much more evenly balanced", "the stakes [to] be higher", and the science fiction elements more prominent. Lorenzo di Bonaventura said that in total, there are around forty robots in the film, while ILM's Scott Farrar has said there are actually sixty. Orci added that he wanted to "modulate" the humor more, and felt he managed the more "outrageous" jokes by balancing them with a more serious plot approach to the Transformers' mythology. Bay concurred that he wanted to please fans by making the tone darker, and that "moms will think its safe enough to bring the kids back out to the movies" despite his trademark sense of humor.

Before Transformers was released, producer DeSanto had "a very cool idea" to introduce the Dinobots, while Bay was interested in an aircraft carrier, which was dropped from the 2007 film. Orci claimed they did not incorporate these characters into Revenge of the Fallen because they could not think of a way to justify the Dinobots' choice of form, and were unable to fit in the aircraft carrier. Orci also admitted he was also dismissive of the Dinobots because he does not like dinosaurs. "I recognize I am weird in that department", he said, but he became fonder of them during filming because of their popularity with fans. He added "I couldn't see why a Transformer would feel the need to disguise himself in front of a bunch of lizards. Movie-wise, I mean. Once the general audience is fully on board with the whole thing, maybe Dinobots in the future." However, Michael Bay said he hated the Dinobots and they had never been in consideration for being featured in the movies. It is the last film in the series to be distributed by DreamWorks.

Transformers: Dark of the Moon (2011) 

For the third film, as a preemptive measure before the release of Revenge of the Fallen, Michael Lucchi and Paramount announced on March 16, 2009, that a third film would be released in IMAX 3-D on July 1, 2011, which earned a surprised response from director Bay:

Screenwriters Roberto Orci and Alex Kurtzman, who had worked on the two previous Transformers films, declined to return for the third film, with Kurtzman declaring that "the franchise is so wonderful that it deserves to be fresh, all the time. We just felt like we'd given it a lot and didn't have an insight for where to go with it next". Revenge of the Fallens co-writer Ehren Kruger became the sole screenwriter for Dark of the Moon. Kruger had frequent meetings with Industrial Light & Magic's (ILM) CGI visual effects producers, who suggested plot points such as the scenes in Chernobyl.

On October 1, 2009, Bay revealed that Dark of the Moon had already gone into pre-production, and its planned release was back to its originally intended date of July 1, 2011, rather than 2012. Due to the revived interest in 3-D technology brought in by the success of Avatar, talks between Paramount, ILM, and Bay had considered the possibility of the next Transformers film being filmed in 3-D, and testing was performed to bring the technology into Bay's work. Bay originally was not much interested in the format as he felt it did not fit his "aggressive style" of filmmaking, but he was convinced after talks with Avatar director James Cameron, who even offered the technical crew from that film. Cameron reportedly told Bay about 3-D, "You gotta look at it as a toy, it's another fun tool to help get emotion and character and create an experience." Bay was reluctant to film with 3-D cameras since in test he found them to be too cumbersome for his filming style, but he did not want to implement the technology in post production either since he was not pleased with the results. In addition to using the 3-D Fusion camera rigs developed by Cameron's team, Bay and the team spent nine months developing a more portable 3-D camera that could be brought into location. On the day of the film's release, Shia LaBeouf announced that Dark of the Moon will be his last Transformers film.

In a hidden extra for the Blu-ray release of Revenge of the Fallen, Bay expressed his intention to make Transformers 3 not necessarily larger than Revenge of the Fallen, but instead deeper into the mythology, to give it more character development, and to make it darker and more emotional. Having been called Transformers 3 up to that point, the film's final title was revealed to be Dark of the Moon in October 2010. After Revenge of the Fallen was panned by critics, Bay acknowledged the general flaws of the script, having blamed the 2007–2008 Writers Guild of America strike prior to the film for many problems. Bay promised to not have the "dorky comedy" from the last film.

Transformers: Age of Extinction (2014) 

In February 2012, producer di Bonaventura stated that a fourth film was in the works, aiming for a 2014 release, with Michael Bay to direct and produce. On the same day, Paramount Pictures and Michael Bay announced a June 27, 2014 release date for a fourth film. Ehren Kruger would pen the script and Steve Jablonsky would score the film, as each had for the previous film. The film is set five years after the events in Transformers: Dark of the Moon. Shia LaBeouf did not return in any future installments. Mark Wahlberg was instead cast in the lead role as new character, Cade Yeager. In November 2012, casting began to search for two more leads. Isabelle Cornish, Nicola Peltz, Gabriella Wilde, and Margaret Qualley were all considered to play Cade's daughter Tessa Yeager, while Luke Grimes, Landon Liboiron, Brenton Thwaites, Jack Reynor, and Hunter Parrish were all considered to play Tessa's race-car-driving boyfriend, Shane Dyson. Bay announced on his website that Reynor would portray Shane and that the fourth film would start the next installment in the overall series; the film was to be a darker sequel to Dark of the Moon and have a different feeling. Peter Cullen, who voiced Optimus Prime in the films, was to reprise his role. Tyrese Gibson was in talks to reprise his role as Sgt. Robert Epps from the original trilogy. Glenn Morshower stated that he was contracted for two films and he was to reprise his role. It was later announced that he would not be return until the next film. With a budget of $165 million, filming was expected to take place in London between April and November 2013—once Pain & Gain, another film that Bay was directing, had finished editing.

On January 8, 2013, it was announced that Reynor was joining Wahlberg in the lead. On March 26, 2013, Nicola Peltz was cast as the female lead. Bay confirmed that the movie was to be in 3D. Bay revealed to Collider that actor Stanley Tucci had joined the cast, and that the film would be the first feature film to be shot using smaller digital IMAX 3D cameras. On May 1, 2013, actor Kelsey Grammer was cast as the lead human villain named "Harold Attinger". On May 6, 2013, actress Sophia Myles was cast in a major supporting role. That same month, Chinese actress Li Bingbing and comedian T. J. Miller joined the cast.

Actor T.J. Miller would be playing the best friend of Wahlberg's character who is a mechanic. Also revealed were two Autobots who would have the following alternate modes—a black-and-blue 2013 Bugatti Veyron Grand Sport Vitesse  named "Drift", and a green 2014 C7 Corvette Stingray concept named Crosshairs. A truck from Western Star Trucks would be Optimus Prime's new alternate mode for the movie. Bumblebee's new alternate mode was revealed to be a modified vintage 1967 Chevrolet Camaro, which later transforms into a 2014 Chevrolet Camaro concept. A green military vehicle (later confirmed to be Hound) and a white emergency response vehicle were also revealed.

Filming began in June 2013, in Detroit, Chicago, Austin, Los Angeles, and Hong Kong.  The film was released on June 27, 2014.

Transformers: The Last Knight (2017) 

In March 2015, Deadline Hollywood reported that Paramount Pictures was in talks with Akiva Goldsman to pitch new ideas for the Transformers franchise's future installments. The studio intends to do what James Cameron and 20th Century Fox have been doing in planning three Avatar sequels, and what Disney has done to revive Star Wars, with sequels and spin-offs. Paramount wants to have their own cinematic universe for Transformers, similar to Marvel's/Disney's Marvel Cinematic Universe (which had been one of Paramount's previous film series), and DC Comics/Warner Bros.' DC Extended Universe. Goldsman is the head of the future projects, and worked with franchise director Michael Bay, executive producer Steven Spielberg, and producer Lorenzo di Bonaventura to organize a "writers' room" that incubates ideas for potential Transformers sequels, prequels and spin-offs. The writers' room members include: Christina Hodson, Lindsey Beer, Andrew Barrer, and Gabriel Ferrari (Ant-Man), Robert Kirkman (The Walking Dead), Art Marcum & Matt Holloway, Zak Penn (Pacific Rim Uprising), Jeff Pinkner (The Amazing Spider-Man 2), Ken Nolan, and Geneva Robertson-Dworet. Kirkman left the room after just one day to undergo throat surgery. In July 2015, Akiva Goldsman and Jeff Pinkner were announced as the fifth Transformers film's screenwriters. However, on November 20, due to Goldsman's commitments creating a writers' room for G.I. Joe and Micronauts properties, Paramount began to negotiate with Art Marcum and Matt Holloway (Iron Man), as well as Ken Nolan (Black Hawk Down), to write the film. Lindsey Beer and Geneva Robertson-Dworet were also brought aboard for writing duties.

After Transformers: Age of Extinction, Bay had decided not to direct any future Transformers films. But in early January 2016, in an interview with Rolling Stone, he stated that he would return to direct the fifth film, and that it will be his last Transformers film. Paramount Pictures spent $80 million on production in Michigan, in return for $21 million in state incentives, under agreements entered into before the state legislature eliminated the film office incentive program in July 2015. In April 2016, Paramount hired cinematographer Jonathan Sela. On May 17, Bay revealed the official title of the film to be The Last Knight on his Instagram account, where he also posted a production video showing a close-up of Optimus Prime's face with purple eyes instead of blue, and his face mostly discolored. The official Twitter account showed a 19-second short video in morse code that translates to "I'm coming for you May 31". On May 31, it was revealed that Megatron would return in the sequel.

Bumblebee (2018) 

Bumblebee is a spin-off film centered on the Transformers character of the same name. It was to be a prequel to the film series. Some called it a reboot of the franchise, although writer Christina Hodson said she did not think about such labels and "tried to look at it as its own thing" and producer Di Bonaventura rejected the term saying only that "It is going to be different than the ones that we've done before." The design and style of the film included both elements from the current franchise and influences from the 1980s Transformers: Generation 1 toyline.

Principal photography on the film began in July 2017, in Los Angeles and San Francisco, California. It was released on December 21, 2018, to positive reviews. Following the film's critical success, Hasbro intends to continue and evolve the franchise similar to Bumblebee.

Transformers: Rise of the Beasts (2023) 

In March 2019, producer Lorenzo di Bonaventura announced ongoing developments for a follow-up to Bumblebee. By January 2020, it was officially announced that a sequel to Bumblebee was in development with a script written by Joby Harold, alongside an adaptation of Transformers: Beast Wars with a script written by James Vanderbilt. The film was then scheduled for release on June 24, 2022, that May, while in November, Steven Caple Jr. was hired to serve as director on the project, which serves as both a Bumblebee sequel and Beast Wars adaptation. In April 2021, Anthony Ramos was cast in one of the lead roles for the film, with Dominique Fishback in final talks to play the lead role. The project will be a joint-venture production between Hasbro, eOne, and Paramount Pictures.

Principal photography began in June 2021, with the official title announced as Transformers: Rise of the Beasts, confirmed to be set after the events of Bumblebee. Rise of the Beasts was scheduled for release in June 2022, but was delayed to June 9, 2023.

Transformers: A New Generation (2024) 
In September 2015, Andrew Barrer and Gabriel Ferrari, who were previously a part of the shared universe writers' room, were hired to write a film that will explore the origins of Cybertron with a working title of "Transformers One". In April 2020, Josh Cooley signed on to direct the animated prequel film. Barrer and Ferrari will co-write a new draft of their previous script, with Cooley. Lorenzo di Bonaventura and Mark Vahradian will serve as producers. The story will take place entirely on Cybertron, and will explore the relationship between Optimus Prime and Megatron, "separate and apart" from what has been portrayed in the live-action films. The project will be a joint-venture production between Hasbro Entertainment, eOne, Paramount Animation, and Paramount Pictures. The film is scheduled for release on July 19, 2024.  In December 2022, the title was reported to be Transformers: A New Generation.

Future 
 Untitled Angel Manuel Soto film: In March 2021, another film entered development directed by Angel Manuel Soto, from a script written by Marco Ramirez. The plot will take place separately from films that have previously released, while Lorenzo di Bonaventura, Don Murphy, and Tom DeSanto remain involved in their producing roles. The project will be a joint-venture production between eOne and Paramount Pictures.
 Untitled Rise of the Beasts sequels: In February 2022 at the ViacomCBS Investors' Event, Paramount announced that Rise of the Beasts will be the first installment of a new trilogy of films.
 Untitled Transformers: The Last Knight sequel: Originally announced during the ongoing plans for a "Transformers Cinematic Universe" with a scheduled release date of June 28, 2019; the film was removed from Paramount's release schedule following the negative reception to The Last Knight. By March 2019, producer Lorenzo di Bonaventura confirmed that another film referred to as "Transformers 7" is still in development, though the film will not be a direct sequel to the previous installment. In September 2021, Josh Duhamel had expressed interest in reprising his role as Col. William Lennox.

Potential shared universe 
In March 2013, during the release of G.I. Joe: Retaliation, producer di Bonaventura announced the studio's plans to develop a G.I. Joe/Transformers crossover. On July 26, 2013, G.I. Joe: Retaliation director Jon M. Chu stated that he is also interested in directing a Transformers/G.I. Joe crossover film. Despite di Bonaventura stating that a crossover was not in the immediate plans for the franchises, he acknowledged that it is something they intended to do. In July 2021, producer Di Bonaventura and actor Henry Golding expressed interest in the possibility of doing the crossover film.

In March 2015, Paramount hired Academy Award-winning screenwriter Akiva Goldsman to oversee and compile a team of writers, to pitch ideas for future films with the intention of expanding the franchise into a cinematic universe. Twelve individual stories were written and pitched for the cinematic universe. Goldsman was tasked with developing a multi-part sequel storyline, along with prequels and spin-off films. A "brain-trust" was commissioned to guide the productions of these stories, including Goldsman, Michael Bay, and producers Steven Spielberg and Lorenzo di Bonaventura. The team of writers who were hired included: Robert Kirkman, Art Marcum, Matt Holloway, Zak Penn, Jeff Pinkner, Andrew Barrer, Gabriel Ferrari, Christina Hodson, Lindsey Beer, Ken Nolan, Geneva Robertson-Dworet, and Steven DeKnight. Goldsman described the writer's room collaboration process, as a way to map out stories that can be further developed by the projects that are green-lit by the brain trust; stating: "...if one of the writers discovers an affinity for [a particular story], they can drive forward on treatments that will have been fleshed out by the whole room." In August 2017, following the poor reception of The Last Knight which Goldsman co-wrote, the filmmaker officially left the franchise.

In December 2018, di Bonaventura stated that there will be further films in the series, while also acknowledging that the franchise will make some changes in tone and style due to the success of Bumblebee.

A crossover film with the G.I. Joe film series is also being developed.

Short films

Transformers: Beginnings (2007) 
Released separately from the first film on home release in October 2007, on DVD as a Walmart Exclusive; the short is an animated prequel, presented in the form of a motion comic, with narration from the character Bumblebee. Mark Ryan provides the voice-over work for the role, while the short depicts Megatron's arrival on Earth, as well as Archibald Witwicky's discovery 4 million years later. The short skips to 2003 with Bumblebee arriving on Earth, and Sector 7's pursuit of him.

Sector 7 Archive (2019) 
Released on the home video release of Bumblebee, two short films under a "Sector 7 Archive" label were released.

Agent Burns: Welcome to Sector 7 (2019) 
A short released as an in-universe orientation video, of Agent Burns addressing new hires.

Sector 7 Adventures: The Battle at Half Dome (2019) 
A short film, released in the form of a motion comic, taking place two years after the events of Bumblebee which depicts a fight between Bumblebee and Soundwave. When Sector 7 is attacked by Soundwave, Bumblebee arrives to protect them. During the ensuing battle, Soundwave demands that Sector 7 give back what belongs to the Decepticons.

Web series

Transformers: Cyber Missions (2010) 
A 13 episode long web mini series released in 2010 and set within and using the Transformers design from the continuity of the live action movies. It was released on Hasbro's website and in 2011 re-released on Transformers official YouTube channel. The series was made by TG Studios in only three months. It is set between the events of Revenge of the Fallen and Dark of the Moon.

Bumblebee's First Life on Earth (2019) 
 is a 3-episode long retelling of the first half of the Bumblebee film with no spoilers. The series was released on Paramount Pictures' Japanese Twitter account.

Principal cast and characters

Cast

Additional crew and production details

Reception

Box office performance

Critical and public response 

With the exception of Bumblebee, common elements of the original film series received negative to mixed reception, such as the repeated formulaic plots, sophomoric and toilet humor, female character objectification, clichéd and controversial characterizations, racial and cultural stereotypes, overuse of MacGuffins, product placement, long running times, and excessive retroactive continuity changes.

The first Transformers film received mixed reviews from critics, with praise for the groundbreaking visual effects, sound design, action sequences, musical score, performances (particularly LaBeouf and Fox), and voice acting (particularly Peter Cullen's return as Optimus Prime). Film critic Roger Ebert gave the film three stars, writing "It's goofy fun with a lot of stuff that blows up real good, and it has the grace not only to realize how preposterous it is, but to make that into an asset."

The second film, Revenge of the Fallen, received negative reviews from critics, who criticized the screenplay and runtime, while praising the visual effects, sound design, action sequences, musical score, performances (particularly LaBeouf, Fox, and Turturro), and voice acting (particularly Peter Cullen, Hugo Weaving, and Tony Todd). Roger Ebert gave the film one star, calling it "a horrible experience of unbearable length, punctuated by three or four amusing moments." The characterization of the Autobot twins, Skids and Mudflap, was heavily criticized. Peter Travers of Rolling Stone magazine labeled them: "two of the most offensive bots in screen history...who do black stereotypes in ways that would shame Jar Jar Binks" and concluded the film "has a shot at the title Worst Movie of the Decade." Others described them as "something out of an old minstrel show" with "conspicuously cartoonish, so-called black voices that indicate that minstrelsy remains as much in fashion in Hollywood as when, well, Jar Jar Binks was set loose by George Lucas."

The third film, Dark of the Moon, received mixed reviews from critics, who praised the visual effects, sound design, action sequences, musical score, performances (particularly LaBeouf and Huntington-Whiteley), voice acting (particularly Peter Cullen, Hugo Weaving, and Leonard Nimoy), and the use of 3D, while criticizing the screenplay and runtime. Peter Bradshaw of The Guardian gave the film a mixed review, saying, "It is as if Bay, perhaps influenced by some stinging critiques, has made an aesthetic policy decision. Because this film is not quite as stupid as the others...But let's face it, these touches are atypical. After half an hour it turns into the same headbanging, eardrum-brutalising action-fest as the other two films." Bradshaw also notes the impressive effects in the Battle of Chicago at the climax and how the September 11 attacks inspired it. A. O. Scott of The New York Times called Dark of the Moon among Michael Bay's best films but said, "I can't decide if this movie is so spectacularly, breathtakingly dumb as to induce stupidity in anyone who watches, or so brutally brilliant that it disarms all reason. What's the difference?" Scott also criticized the film for continuing the series' pattern of "tongue-in-cheek revisionist history" by using the Space Race as the catalyst for the film's events. Dan Kois of The Village Voice also criticized Michael Bay's continuation of "exploiting America's iconic tragedies for maximum impact." Chris Hewitt of Empire Online gave the film 2 out of 5 stars, saying that Dark of the Moon is better than Revenge of the Fallen but not by much. Hewitt praised the last 45 minutes and the best use of 3D since Avatar. Roger Ebert rated the film 1 out of 4 stars, and Peter Travers of Rolling Stones called it "a movie bereft of wit, wonder, imagination, and any genuine reason for being." Christopher Orr of The Atlantic said Dark of the Moon is an improvement over the previous film in almost every way apart from its length, praising the special effects, 3D usage, and intense action.

The fourth film Age of Extinction received negative reviews from critics, who criticized the runtime and screenplay, while praising the visual effects, sound design, action sequences, musical score, darker tone, performances (particularly Wahlberg, Grammer, and Tucci), and voice acting (particularly Peter Cullen and Mark Ryan). Sam Adams of IndieWire labeled Age of Extinction "a new, terrible kind of cinema" that could have been written by "a high school sophomore with a permanent hard-on." Angela Wattercutter of Wired magazine criticized Age of Extinctions insensitive use of the War on Terror and the September 11 aftermath as inspiration with the Transformers treated as "enemy combatants" and "alien terrorists", and being hunted by Kelsey Grammer's xenophobic government agent.

The fifth film The Last Knight received negative reviews from critics, who criticized the runtime, screenplay, and frequent aspect ratio changes throughout, while praising the visual effects, sound design, action sequences, musical score, performances (particularly Wahlberg, Hopkins, and Merced), and voice acting (particularly Peter Cullen, John Goodman, and Jim Carter). Yohana Desta of Vanity Fair called the film "an apocalyptic identity crisis come to life" and "an unruly Frankenstein's monster with shoddy stitchwork." Desta noted that despite the film's MacGuffin-focused plot, the visual effects remain impressive. Ian Freer of Empire magazine rated the film 2 out of 5 stars. Freer said that like the previous films, it is "bogged down in backstory, lacks a real feel for its characters and still can't find a way to make its robot-on-robot action exhilarating... It is amazing how a series with so much nostalgic goodwill, technical finesse and behind the scenes talent have led so often to experiences that are so joyless."

The 2018 spin-off film, Bumblebee, received positive reviews from critics, who praised its lighter tone, story, visuals, performances, direction, and faithfulness to the 1980s Transformers show. Glenn Kenny of The New York Times praised the plot, Christina Hodson's script, and Hailee Steinfeld's performance, calling her possibly the only appealing main human character in the franchise so far. James Dyer of Empire magazine gave the film 4 out of 5 stars, praising aspects such as Travis Knight's directing, the screenplay, Steinfield and John Cena's acting, and the film's '80s nostalgia; he praised the film for acting as a love letter to Steven Spielberg's Amblin films. In a review for The Hollywood Reporter, Justin Lowe praised the improved digital effects, including the "sharp visual details, realistic color shading and seamless transitions between robot and vehicular forms." Lowe also noted the film's focus on a PG tone despite its PG-13 rating, its character-driven story, and its improved humor compared to its predecessors.

Accolades 
The franchise has been frequently praised and won awards for its sound design. Michael Bay praised the crew and highlighted the importance of sound saying "I have like 2,000 people — through their artistry — making my dreams a film," Bay said. "The artistry of this sound group is just amazing. I love, love sound. It's 45–50% of the movies."

Academy Awards

Golden Raspberry Awards

Visual Effects Society Awards

Other media 

In addition to the films, the film series has a promotional expanded series that is set both before and after the events of the films. This includes comic books, video games, and novels. While the novels are partially based on the films themselves, and the video games are not in the same continuity as the films, the comic books and graphic novels are in the same continuity and fill in several parts of the stories from the films. Also, Transformers: The Ride 3D is an amusement ride based on the film series. The ride introduced a new character, Autobot Evac, voiced by Dustin James Leighton.

See also 
 The Transformers: The Movie, a 1986 animated film based on the original TV series
 G.I. Joe film series (soon to be a shared cinematic universe with ROM, M.A.S.K., Visionaries and Micronauts)

Notes

References

External links 

 
 

 
Action film series
Alien invasions in films
American film series
Science fiction franchises
DreamWorks Pictures films
Paramount Pictures franchises
Science fiction film series
Film series introduced in 2007